A rolling-block action is a form of firearm action where the sealing of the breech is done with a specially shaped breechblock able to rotate on a pin. The breechblock is shaped like a section of a circle.
The breechblock is locked into place by the hammer, thus preventing the cartridge from moving backwards at the moment of firing. By cocking the hammer, the breechblock can be rotated freely to reload the weapon.

History

The Remington Rolling Block rifle is one of the most successful single-shot weapons ever developed. It is a strong and simple action, very reliable, and not prone to be jammed by dirt or rough usage. It was invented by Leonard Geiger during the United States Civil War and patented in 1863, who (along with his partner, Charles Alger) negotiated a royalty deal with Remington when they put it into production as the so-called "split breech" action late in the war. That design was re-engineered by Joseph Rider in 1865 and called the "Remington System". The first firearm based on it, the Model 1865 Remington Pistol, was offered for sale to the United States Army and Navy in 1866. While the Army turned the design down, the Navy committed to purchase 5000 pistols.

The first rifle based on this design was introduced at the Paris Exposition in 1867 and the United States Navy placed an order for 12,000 rifles. Within a year it had become the standard military rifle of several nations, including Sweden, Norway, and Denmark.

Many earlier percussion rifles and muskets were converted to rolling-block designs in the interim before the development of more modern bolt-action designs.

The Swedish–Norwegian Remington M1867 and US Springfield Model 1870 and Springfield Model 1871 also had this action.

Barton Jenks rolling block action
A single-shot action developed by Barton Jenks from Bridesburg, Philadelphia right after the Civil War was locked not by the hammer itself, but by a separate hinging piece on the breechblock; it was tested by the US military in 1866 but not adopted.

See also
Bolt action
Lever action
Pump action
Break action
Falling-block action
Semi-automatic rifle

References

Firearm actions
Firearm components